Great George may refer to:

England's ninth-largest bell, hung in the Wills Memorial Building, University of Bristol
A badge of the Order of the Garter

See also
Great George Street, Hong Kong
Great George Street, Westminster, London